.

Royal Hill is mount at the Nagano prefecture, Japan.
Coordinates: 34.85,138.55; Google map:
.
The North slope is grassy and shallow, suitable for beginner skiers and snowboarders.

The car access to Royal Hill does not require the four-wheel drive, but at heavy snow, the snow chains may help a lot.

Near mounts: Kurumayama, Kirigamine.

Mountains of Nagano Prefecture